John Henry Nash (1871-1947) was a fine printer.

Life 
He was born in Woodbridge, Ontario, Canada and left school at sixteen to apprentice as a printer. In 1895, he arrived in San Francisco, where he was to develop his reputation. With Bruce Brough he founded the Twentieth Century Press. In 1903, Nash was approached by Paul Elder, an established publisher who had printed some of his publications with Twentieth Century, and who had just dissolved a publishing partnership. Elder became a partner in Twentieth Century Press, which was renamed Tomoye Press, and Nash became a partner in the newly formed Paul Elder & Company. Nash designed and typeset many of Elder's most enduring publications. 

Nash and Elder had a falling out in 1911, and Nash formed a new partnership, which he ended in 1915. In 1916, Nash started his own press, and his efforts helped establish San Francisco as a center of fine printing. In titling his 1928 book about Nash, Edward F. O'Day went so far as to dub him "The Aldus of San Francisco." In 1938, the poor economy forced him to shut down his operation.  

In 1938 Nash moved to Eugene, Oregon, where he established the John Henry Nash Fine Arts Press at the University of Oregon. In 1943, he returned to Berkeley, California, where he died in 1947.

Selected bibliography 
Robert Louis Stevenson, The Silverado Squatters (1923). With illustrations by Howard Whitford Willard.

Papers 
The John Henry Nash papers reside at the Bancroft Library, University of California, Berkeley

References

External link 

1871 births
1947 deaths
Canadian printers
People from Vaughan
People from the San Francisco Bay Area
Canadian emigrants to the United States